Irfan Ali Karim (born 25 September 1992) is a Kenyan cricketer and a former captain of the Kenya cricket team.

In January 2018, he was named in Kenya's squad for the 2018 ICC World Cricket League Division Two tournament. In September 2018, he was named in Kenya's squad for the 2018 Africa T20 Cup. The following month, he was named in Kenya's squad for the 2018 ICC World Cricket League Division Three tournament in Oman.

In May 2019, he was named in Kenya's squad for the Regional Finals of the 2018–19 ICC T20 World Cup Africa Qualifier tournament in Uganda. In September 2019, he was named in Kenya's squad for the 2019 ICC T20 World Cup Qualifier tournament in the United Arab Emirates. He was the leading run-scorer for Kenya in the tournament, with 173 runs in six matches. In November 2019, he was named as the captain of Kenya's squad for the Cricket World Cup Challenge League B tournament in Oman.

In October 2021, he was named in Kenya's squad for the Regional Final of the 2021 ICC Men's T20 World Cup Africa Qualifier tournament in Rwanda.

References

1992 births
Living people
Kenyan cricketers
Kenya One Day International cricketers
Kenya Twenty20 International cricketers
Place of birth missing (living people)
Wicket-keepers
Kenyan Muslims
Kenyan people of Indian descent